This is a list of envoys of Estonia, that is, diplomats representing Estonia; until 1991, Estonian diplomats had the rank of Envoy Extraordinary and Minister Plenipotentiary. 

Friedrich Akel (1871–1941)
1922–1923 to Finland
1928–1933 to Sweden, Norway and Denmark
1934–1936 to Germany and Netherlands

Ado Birk (1883–1942)
1922–1926 to the Soviet Union

Aleksander Hellat (1881–1943)
1921–1922 to Latvia and Poland
1922 to Romania, Hungary and Greece
1923–1931 to Finland
1925–1927 to Hungary

Oskar Kallas (1868–1946)
1920–1922 to Finland
1922–1934 to United Kingdom and Netherlands

Heinrich Laretei (1892–1973)
1926–1928 to the Soviet Union
1928–1931 to Lithuania
1936–1940 to Sweden, Denmark and Norway

Jaan Lattik (1878–1967)
1939–1940 to Lithuania

Juhan Leppik (1894–1965)
1924–1927 to Poland and Romania
1931–1936 to Lithuania
1936–1940 to Italy
1937–1940 to Hungary
1937–1938 to Austria

Johannes Markus (1884–1969)
1935–1939 to Poland, Romania and Czechoslovakia
1939–1940 to Turkey, Hungary and Romania

Karl Menning (1874–1941)
1923–1933 to Germany
1925–1933 to Austria
1931–1933 to Hungary
1933–1937 to Latvia

Rudolf Möllerson (1892–1940)
1937–1939 to Finland
1939–1940 to Germany
1940 to Netherlands

Ants Piip (1884–1942)
1923–1925 to the United States

Karl Robert Pusta (1883–1963)
1921–1932 to France
1921–1923 to Italy
1923–1932 to Belgium
1928–1932 to Spain
1932–1934 to Poland, Romania and Czechoslovakia
1935 to Sweden, Norway and Denmark

August Rei (1886–1963)
1938–1940 to Soviet union

Hans Rebane (1882–1961)
1931–1937 to Finland
1937–1940 to Latvia

August Torma (1895–1971)
1931–1934 to Italy
1931–1939 to the League of Nations
1934–1971 to the United Kingdom

Julius Seljamaa (1883–1936)
1922–1928 to Latvia
1925–1926 to Lithuania
1928–1933 to the Soviet Union

Karl Selter (1898–1958)
1939–1940 to the League of Nations and Vatican
1940 to Switzerland

Otto Strandman (1875–1941)
1927–1929 to Poland, Romania and Czechoslovakia
1933–1939 to France, Belgium, Spain and Vatican

Karl Tofer (1885–1942)
1927–1931 to Italy
1927–1930 to Hungary
1930–1932 to Poland, Romania and Czechoslovakia
1933–1936 to the Soviet Union
1936–1939 to Germany and Netherlands

August Traksmaa (1893–1942)
1936–1937 to the Soviet Union

Tõnis Vares (1859–1925)
1921–1922 to the Soviet Russia

Eduard Virgo (1878–1938)
1928–1931 to Latvia

Aleksander Warma (1890–1970)
1938–1939 to Lithuania
1939–1944 to Finland

Oskar Öpik (1895–1974)
1936–1938 to Lithuania
1940 to France

 
Envoys